Stuyvesant may refer to:

People
 Peter Stuyvesant (1592–1672), the last governor of New Netherland
 Peter Gerard Stuyvesant (1778–1847), lawyer, landowner and philanthropist.
 Rutherfurd Stuyvesant (1843–1909), socialite and land developer
 Stuyvesant Fish (1851–1923), American businessman

Places
 Stuyvesant, New York, a town in Columbia County, New York, United States
 Stuyvesant Street (Manhattan), a street in Manhattan
 Stuyvesant Square, a park in Manhattan, and the surrounding neighborhood
 Stuyvesant Heights, Brooklyn
 Bedford–Stuyvesant, Brooklyn
 Stuyvesant Town–Peter Cooper Village
 Stuyvesant Apartments
 Stuyvesant High School, a high school in Manhattan

Other
 Peter Stuyvesant (cigarette), a cigarette brand by British American Tobacco
 Stuyvesant Handicap, American Thoroughbred horse race

See also